William J. Murchison Jr. (born August 2, 1956) is an American professional golfer.

Murchison played on the PGA Tour and its developmental tour (Ben Hogan Tour/Nike Tour, now Web.com Tour) from 1978 to 1996. On the PGA Tour (1978–80, 1983, 1993), his best finish was T-12 at the 1980 B.C. Open. On the Nike Tour (1992, 1994–96), he won the 1995 Nike Tallahassee Open. Murchison won a total of thirty-four professional events on various tours, including the Spacecoast, North Florida PGA, and Mid-Atlantic Tour. His career low round was 61, shot at the Goodyear Golf Club during a tournament on the National Golf Tour in 1979.

Murchison served as the president and CEO of Murchison Drilling Schools, a company founded by his father, that trains oil field drilling personnel. They provide training in drilling operations and well control. Murchison Drilling Schools was sold to Well Academy in January 2020, and the name was changed to Well Academy Murchison. Murchison stayed on as the GM through January 2022. 

Murchison grew up in Iran, where his father worked for the oil consortium. His family spent fifteen years in Iran, living in Agha Jari, Masjed-I-Sulaiman, Tehran, and Ahwaz. He also learned to play golf in Iran, playing on oil/sand greens and dirt fairways. 

Murchison was ordained in 1986 as a minister of the gospel. In 1995, Murchison had a call from God to plant churches, and retired from professional golf to plant a church in Acworth. While pastoring the church, he also served asa chaplain at the Cobb County Adult Detention Center. In 2010, Murchison planted the East Mountain Vineyard Church in Edgewood, New Mexico. After establishing that church, he started the Connection Church of Albuquerque. In 2021, Murchison moved to Rome, Georgia, and is planting the Connection Church of Rome. 

His son, Bill Murchison III, is a PGA assistant pro at Towne Lake Hills Golf Club in Woodstock, Georgia and played in the 2012 PGA Championship.

Professional wins (1)

Nike Tour wins (1)

Nike Tour playoff record (0–2)

Results in major championships

CUT = missed the half-way cut
"T" = tied
Note: Murchison only played in the U.S. Open.

See also
Spring 1978 PGA Tour Qualifying School graduates
Fall 1979 PGA Tour Qualifying School graduates
1982 PGA Tour Qualifying School graduates
1992 PGA Tour Qualifying School graduates

References

External links

American male golfers
PGA Tour golfers
Golfers from Louisiana
Sportspeople from Lake Charles, Louisiana
1956 births
Living people